Merahi metua no Tehamana (English Tehamana Has Many Parents or The Ancestors of Tehamana) is an 1893 painting by the French artist Paul Gauguin, currently in the collection of the Art Institute of Chicago. The painting is a portrait of Paul Gauguin's wife Teha'amana during his first visit to Tahiti in 1891–1893. This marriage has always provoked controversy because it was arranged and completed in the course of a single afternoon and Gauguin claimed Teha'amana was just thirteen years old at the time.

A sculpted head is also known to be a portrait of Teha'amana. She is assumed to have posed for numerous other paintings of the time, including the celebrated Spirit of the Dead Watching.

Teha'amana 

Teha'amana was the native wife of Paul Gauguin during his first visit to Tahiti in 1891 to 1893. It was common at that time for French colonists to take native wives; the wives simply referred to as  vahine, Tahitian for "woman". These vahines were often underage children, as was the case with Teha'amana, their marriage being arranged by their family for reasons of status or financial advantage. The marriages were generally not legally binding. All three of Gauguin's vahines, the two he took after Teha'amana eventually returned home while Teha'amana herself declined to continue their relationship when Gauguin returned to Tahiti in 1895. Teha'amana undoubtedly saw herself as conventionally married according to her local customs, but for Gauguin the marriage was clearly a temporary arrangement. Nevertheless, he did profess a tender love for Teha'amana in his journal .   Pierre Loti's  Le Mariage de Loti, a book that influenced Gauguin's decision to travel to Tahiti, was an immensely popular account of such a marriage twenty years earlier, although in that case the marriage was actually a fictional composite of many casual liaisons indulged by Loti during a two-month visit to Papeete. In Loti's account his wife was fourteen years old, while in Gauguin's account Teha'amana was just thirteen years old.

The name Teha'amana is formed from the definite article te, the causative particle ha'a and the substantive mana ("strength"), and thus signifies "giver of strength", hence its frequent occurrence in ancient prayers and folklore. In his account of their idyll together, Gauguin described how in the evenings Teha'amana would recount their ancient myths as they lay in bed. Teha'amana was nevertheless a Christian, as evidenced by the missionary dress she wears in the portrait, and would have known nothing of Tahitian mythology. Bengt Danielsson, the Kon-Tiki anthropologist, notes that Teha'amana recounting the old myths is an especially barefaced fiction, because not only were these largely forgotten, they had always been withheld from women. All Gauguin's accounts of ancient Tahitian religion in Noa Noa were copied from other sources without adequate acknowledgement.

Men took vahines for sexual and other practical advantages, such as gathering food supplies. This was because Tahitian families were self-sufficient in food. The staples of breadfruit and bananas were gathered high in the mountains on a weekly basis, while fish was abundant in the lagoons. Pigs were hunted in the undergrowth. As a consequence there was no trade in foodstuffs and offering food was regarded as an act of charity. Instead of gathering the food himself, Gaugain opted to take a vahine so that her family could provide for him. Having a vahine meant at least he had access to wild fruit and fresh shrimp gathered by her, as well as her own family's extensive food stores.

Gauguin's account of Teha'amana in Noa Noa, where he refers to her as Tehura, is mainly confined to their marriage, contracted in a single afternoon in the course of a planned excursion round the island, and a few other episodes including notably the genesis of his painting Spirit of the Dead Watching. Danielsson was able to find some oral and civic sources in the course of his researches.

Teha'amana's family came from Rarotonga, one of the Cook Islands. Before settling in Tahiti, they spent some time in Huahine, one of the Society Islands, where Teha'amana was born. In Tahiti they settled at Fa'aone, some fifteen miles to the east of Gauguin's bamboo hut at Mataiea, where Gauguin encountered them at some time during or after November 1891, taking Teha'amana as his vahine the same day.  No birth certificate is known to confirm her age, but it is likely she was only in her early teens, as were his two subsequent vahines. She was pregnant by August 1892 according to a letter of Gauguin's, but there is no further record of the child: Danielsson thought it had been aborted, Mathews thinks it more likely it was adopted, as was commonly the custom in Tahitian society. Gauguin records Teha'amana was at the quay on 14 June 1893 to wish him a traditionally tearful departure from Tahiti. When Gauguin returned in 1895, Teha'amana had married again, but nevertheless spent a week with him before returning to her husband, according to a letter Gauguin sent Monfreid. Gauguin makes no further mention of Teha'amana. After his death, when he had become famous, Teha'amana made no effort to come forward as his vahine. Mathews thinks this may indicate there was in reality no single Teha'amana, or that she was simply indifferent to his memory as a matter of little consequence.

After Gauguin left in 1893, Teha'amana remained in Mataiea, working at first for Chief Tetuanui, but soon marrying a young Tahitian boy, named Ma'ari, from neighbouring Papara. She bore him two sons, one of whom was still alive when Danielsson was researching Gauguin. From him, Danielsson gathered the information that the reason Teha'amana declined to live with Gauguin in 1895, despite generous gifts of bead necklaces and brass rings, was that she was repulsed by Gaugain and the syphilitic sores covering his entire body. Danielsson was able to locate a death certificate showing that Teha'amana died on 9 December 1918 in Mataiea from the Spanish flu epidemic that carried off a quarter of Tahiti's native population. She is buried in Mataiea, although her tombstone bears no indication of her relationship with Gauguin. A circa 1888 photograph of a young Tahitian girl by Charles Georges Spitz is often reproduced as one of Teha'amana, although Danielsson points out there is no evidence at all for the identification.

Description

The inscription below the idol reads "MERAHI METUA NO | TEHAMANA". This means "Teha'amana has many parents", a reference to Teha'amana possessing foster-parents as well as her natural parents in accordance with the  Tahitian custom (Gauguin had to negotiate with both sets of parents when arranging the marriage). The placement of the inscription below the idol may also emphasise the belief that all Tahitians descended from the union of the ancient deities Hina and Ta'aroa.

Danielsson thought the painting a farewell portrait, depicting Teha'amana in regal state dressed in her best churchgoing clothes and holding a plaited palm fan, a symbol of beauty. The red tiare flower she wears at her left ear signifies she is married. When he was researching his book, Danielsson showed a photograph of the portrait to a native, Puto'ura a Ta'iterafa'ato'a, fifteen years old in 1893 when the portrait was painted. Ta'iterafa'ato'a recognised Teha'amana at once, identifying the scar tissue above her right eye as the result of an accident she suffered when she was very young riding a pony, defying her parents. The portrait was bought in at Gauguin's 1895 Hôtel Drouot auction at only 300 francs and subsequently gifted to Daniel de Monfreid, Gauguin's great champion in Tahiti, suggesting it held sentimental value for Gauguin.

Charles Stuckey remarks that the two ripe mangoes, placed on a low table to Teha'amana's right, probably represented the bounty of Tahiti, if not Teha'amana's fertility herself. The idol is taken to be a representation of Hina, borrowed from Hindu sculptures presenting the life-giving gesture. As a counterfoil, the heads that hover above each of Teha'amana's shoulders are evil spirits, suggesting a dialogue between good and evil or between life and death. The glyphs behind Teha'amana's head are Rongorongo glyphs from Easter Island, although Gauguin's examples are imaginary. These glyphs had been discovered scarcely thirty years earlier and Gauguin would have seen examples both at the Exposition Universelle of 1889 and in Papeete, where a local bishop researching them had a number of examples in his care. The glyphs have never been deciphered and Gauguin's intention was probably to emphasise the impenetrability of Tahitian culture. In his Noa Noa account, he remarked he found Tehama'ana herself impenetrable, thus perhaps the Mona Lisa expression he gives her in the portrait.

The portrait is closely based on a charcoal study and, taken together with the unduly short proportions of the arms, suggests the portrait may not have been painted directly from the model.

Other portraits 

The only other portrait known certainly to be of Teha'amana is a sculpted head in the form of a hollow mask in the Musée d'Orsay. The wood carving is curious because it carries a roughly hewn figure of Eve in its inside. Stuckey suggests this is a reference to the Edenic paradise Gauguin said he had found with Teha'amana, but observes also that Gauguin had questioned her fidelity in his Noa Noa account and suggests the figure might also represent fantasies on Teha'amana's part as Eve the temptress, the greens eyes of the polychromed head perhaps signifying jealousy.

Notes

References and sources 
References

Sources
 Danielsson, Bengt (1965). Gauguin in the South Seas. New York: Doubleday and Company.
 
 Gauguin, Paul; Morice, Charles (1901). Noa Noa: The Tahiti Journal of Paul Gauguin.
 Mathews, Nancy Mowll (2001). Paul Gauguin, an Erotic Life. New Haven, Connecticut: Yale University Press, .
 Pollock, Griselda. Avant-Garde Gambits: Gender and the Colour of Art History, London: Thames and Hudson, 1993.
 Solomon-Godeau, Abigail. Going Native, Paul Gauguin and the Invention of the Primitivist Modernist. The Expanding Discourse: Feminism and Art History. 1st ed. Boulder, CO: WestView, 1992. 313-329

 Thomson, Belinda (1987). Gauguin. London: Thames and Hudson. .
 Taylor, Sue. "Oviri: Gauguin's savage woman". Journal of Art History, Volume 62, Issue 3/4, 1993. 197–220.
 Wadley, Nicholas (1985). Noa Noa: Gauguin's Tahiti, London: Phaidon Press. .

External links 
 Selection from  Mario Vargas Llosa's novel The Way to Paradise dealing with Teha'amana's 1895 visit to Gauguin.
 Merahi metua no Tehamana (Tehamana Has Many Parents or The Ancestors of Tehamana) in the Art Institute of Chicago's Digital Publication, Gauguin Paintings, Sculpture, and Graphic Works at the Art Institute of Chicago.

1893 paintings
Paintings by Paul Gauguin
Post-impressionist paintings
Tahitian art
Paintings in the collection of the Art Institute of Chicago